Nyad is an upcoming American biographical sports drama film directed by Elizabeth Chai Vasarhelyi and Jimmy Chin and starring Annette Bening as Diana Nyad.  The film is Vasarhelyi and Chin's narrative feature directorial debut and is based on Nyad's autobiography Find a Way.

Cast
Annette Bening as Diana Nyad
Jodie Foster as Bonnie Stoll
Rhys Ifans as John Bartlett

Production
In January 2022, it was announced that Netflix will distribute the film.  In March 2022, it was announced that production was underway.

References

External links
 

Upcoming films
American sports drama films
American biographical drama films
Biographical films about LGBT people
Biographical films about sportspeople
Black Bear Pictures films
Films based on autobiographies
Films directed by Elizabeth Chai Vasarhelyi
Films directed by Jimmy Chin
Swimming films
Upcoming English-language films
Upcoming Netflix original films